Arsène Mersch (14 December 1913, in Koerich – 11 July 1980, in Koerich) was a Luxembourgian professional road bicycle racer and cyclo-cross racer, who became national champion in both categories twice. He also won one Tour de France stage, and wore the yellow jersey for one day.

Major results

1934
GP Faber
1935
 national road race champion
Stage 2 Volta Ciclista a Catalunya
1936
1936 Tour de France:
Winner stage 21
5th place overall classification
Wearing yellow jersey for one day
 national cyclo-cross champion
Stage 5 Tour of Belgium
1938
 national cyclo-cross champion
Stage 1 Tour de Suisse
1939
Stage 8 Tour de Suisse
 national cyclo-cross champion
 national road race champion

External links 

1913 births
1980 deaths
People from Koerich
Luxembourgian male cyclists
Luxembourgian Tour de France stage winners
Tour de Suisse stage winners